Boholmarna is a locality situated in Kalmar Municipality, Kalmar County, Sweden with 297 inhabitants in 2010. It consists of several islands.

References 

Populated places in Kalmar County
Populated places in Kalmar Municipality